Tommaso Coletti (born 9 May 1984) is an Italian footballer who plays for Bisceglie as a central midfielder.

Club career
Born in Canosa di Puglia, Coletti spent the vast majority of his career playing for Serie C1 clubs, before signing with Serie C2 side Teramo in August 2012. After being an important midfield unit for Teramo he moved to Serie B side Brescia in the following year.

On 7 September Coletti made his division debut, starting in a 1–1 home draw against Novara; his first goal came on 12 October, netting his side's last of a 2–2 draw at Spezia.

On 27 June 2015, he was signed by Foggia for free.

On 25 August 2019, he joined Serie D club Cerignola. On 24 August 2021, he moved to Bisceglie.

References

External links

1984 births
People from Canosa di Puglia
Footballers from Apulia
Living people
Association football midfielders
Italian footballers
A.S. Martina Franca 1947 players
Calcio Foggia 1920 players
Delfino Pescara 1936 players
Cosenza Calcio players
S.S. Fidelis Andria 1928 players
U.S. Pergolettese 1932 players
S.S. Teramo Calcio players
Brescia Calcio players
Matera Calcio players
U.S. Triestina Calcio 1918 players
S.S.D. Audace Cerignola players
A.S. Bisceglie Calcio 1913 players
Serie B players
Serie C players
Serie D players
Sportspeople from the Province of Barletta-Andria-Trani